The Company of Merchant Adventurers usually refers to the 
Company of Merchant Adventurers of London, founded in 1407 and London's leading guild of overseas merchants.

It may also refer to:
Company of Merchant Adventurers to New Lands, founded in 1551, which later developed into the Muscovy Company or the Russia Company 
Company of Merchant Adventurers of Newcastle  
Company of Merchant Adventurers of Exeter
Company of Merchant Adventurers of York who, uniquely still own and use their original timber-framed Guildhall completed by 1368, the Merchant Adventurers' Hall
The Bristol equivalent is the Society of Merchant Venturers, now a charitable organisation
 The Adventurers Act of 1642 was so called to encourage London's merchant adventurers to lend money to the Long Parliament to pay for the Wars of the Three Kingdoms